Jack Olson may refer to:

 Jack B. Olson (1920–2003), American businessman and politician
 Jack Olson (Australian politician) (1916–2008), member of the South Australian House of Assembly